The 2009 Winter Universiade, the XXIV Winter Universiade took place in Harbin, China. Student athletes from 44 countries took part in the games.

Selection
Harbin was selected by FISU on January 10, 2005 over future 2011 Winter Universiade host city Erzurum. They were the only two candidates.

Venues
Harbin now has four stadiums for international ice games and five training stadiums. Among the venues, the following are mentioned in the official web site:
 Yabuli Olympic Snow Sports Center (about 100 km from Harbin)
 Heilongjiang University
 Harbin International Conference Exhibition and Sports Center (Both stadium and gymnasium)
These venues were used for the Asian Games and were part of Harbin's unsuccessful application for the 2010 Winter Olympics.

There will be two athlete's villages, the main one in Harbin and the second one in Yabuli.

Sports

Ice disciplines
 Curling
 Figure skating
 Ice Hockey
 Short track speed skating
 Speed skating

Snow disciplines
 Alpine skiing
 Cross country skiing
 Ski jumping
 Nordic combined
 Freestyle skiing
 Snowboarding
 Biathlon

Medal table

See also
Sports in China

References

External links
Official web site of Harbin 2009

 
2009
U
Universiade Winter
U
Sport in Harbin
Multi-sport events in China
February 2009 sports events in China
Winter sports competitions in China